This is a list of Turkmen regions and the capital city of Ashgabat by Human Development Index as of 2023 with data for the year 2021.

See also 
 List of countries by Human Development Index

References 

Turkmenistan
Turkmenistan
Human Development Index
Regions By Human Development Index